Pavle Marčinković (born May 6, 1989) is a Croatian professional basketball player, currently playing for Cedevita Junior of the Croatian League and the ABA League. Standing at 1.97 m, he plays at the forward positions.

During the 2020-21 season, Marčinković played for Split, averaging 7.1 points and 4.9 assists per game. He signed with Zadar on October 6, 2021.

National team career
Marčinković was part of the Croatia national team youth programs. He played at the 2007 FIBA Europe Under-18 Championship and the 2009 FIBA Europe Under-20 Championship. He has also played for the senior team at the 2013 EuroBasket Qualifications, at the 2019 FIBA Basketball World Cup qualifications, the 2021 EuroBasket qualifications and the 2019 NBA Summer League.

References

External links
 ABA Liga Profile
 FIBA archive Profile
 proballers.com Profile
 realGM Profile

1989 births
Living people
ABA League players
Apollon Limassol BC players
Basketball players from Zadar
Croatian men's basketball players
Croatian expatriate basketball people in Bulgaria
Croatian expatriate basketball people in Cyprus
Forwards (basketball)
KK Cibona players
KK Split players
KK Zadar players
KK Zagreb players
PBC Academic players
KK Borik Puntamika players
KK Cedevita Junior players